Manant or ManAnt or variation, may refer to:

Characters
 ManAnt (character), a fictional character from The Aquabats! Super Show!; see List of The Aquabats! Super Show! characters
 Manant, a fictional character from 2011 Indian TV drama Iss Pyaar Ko Kya Naam Doon?
 Manant, a fictional character from 2001 French-Algerian film Inch'Allah Dimanche

Other uses
 "ManAnt!" (TV episode), 2012 animated episode of The Aquabats! Super Show!; see List of The Aquabats! Super Show! episodes

See also

 Antman (disambiguation), including ant-man
 Man (disambiguation)
 Ant (disambiguation)